Bridetherium is an extinct genus of morganucodontan from Early Jurassic deposits of southern Wales, United Kingdom. Bridetherium is known from some isolated upper and lower molariform. It was collected in the Pant Quarry, Vale of Glamorgan. It was first named by William A. Clemens in 2011 and the type species is Bridetherium dorisae. The species name is in honour of early mammal paleontologist Doris Mary Kermack.

References 

Morganucodonts
Hettangian life
Jurassic synapsids of Europe
Jurassic France
Fossils of France
Fossil taxa described in 2011
Taxa named by William A. Clemens Jr.
Prehistoric cynodont genera